The Australia women's national cricket team toured New Zealand in January and February 1990. They first played against New Zealand in three Test matches, winning the series 1–0. They then played against New Zealand in three One Day Internationals, which were competed for the Rose Bowl, winning the series 2–1.

Squads

Tour Matches

60-over match: New Zealand Emerging Players v Australia

50-over match: Canterbury Women's Invitation XI v Australia

WTest Series

1st Test

2nd Test

3rd Test

WODI Series

1st ODI

2nd ODI

3rd ODI

References

External links
Australia Women tour of New Zealand 1989/90 from Cricinfo

Women's international cricket tours of New Zealand
1990 in New Zealand cricket
Australia women's national cricket team tours